Vincent Anthony Davies  (born 15 September 1946) is an Anglican priest. He was the Archdeacon of Croydon from 1994 to 2011.

Davies was educated at St. Michael's College, Llandaff  and  ordained in 1973. His first posts were  curacies at St James, Owton Manor and St Faith, Wandsworth, after which he was its Parish Priest until 1981. He was in charge of St John Walworth from then until 1994 and was Rural Dean of Southwark and Newington from 1988 to 1993.

References

1946 births
Alumni of St Michael's College, Llandaff
Archdeacons of Croydon
Living people